The 1956 Chicago Cardinals season was the team's 37th season in the National Football League. The Cardinals improved on their previous year's 4–7–1 record, winning seven games for a runner-up finish in the Eastern Conference. They failed to qualify for the playoffs (NFL title game) for the eighth consecutive season.

Regular season 
 On October 7, the Cardinals played the New York Giants in front of only 21,799 fans. The week before, against Cleveland in the season opener, the gate was only 20,966. It was the smallest paid attendance of the NFL's six opening week games.

Schedule

Standings

References 

1956
Chicago Cardinals
Chicago Card